Bethel Methodist Church or Bethel Methodist Episcopal Church or Old Bethel Methodist Church may refer to:

 Bethel Methodist Church (denomination), a small Texas-based denomination

or it may refer to individual church buildings/congregations:

 Old Bethel Methodist Church (Arkansas), near Paragould, Arkansas, listed on the National Register of Historic Places (NRHP)
 Bethel Methodist Protestant Church, Andrewsville, Delaware, NRHP-listed
 Bethel Methodist Episcopal Church (Bluffton, Indiana), NRHP-listed
 Mount Bethel Methodist Church, Vienna, New Jersey, NRHP-listed
 Bethel Methodist Church (Bantam, Ohio), NRHP-listed
 Bethel Methodist Episcopal Church (Pleasant City, Ohio), NRHP-listed
 Bethel Methodist Church (Charleston, South Carolina), NRHP-listed
 Old Bethel United Methodist Church, also in Charleston, South Carolina, also NRHP-listed

See also
Bethel Baptist Church (disambiguation)
Bethel African Methodist Episcopal Church (disambiguation)